Sinatra And Swingin' Brass is a 1962 studio album by Frank Sinatra.

This is the first time Sinatra worked with arranger/composer Neal Hefti on an album project, following a single-only session that took place in April 1962. For Sinatra and Swingin' Brass, the singer re-recorded a number of songs he had previously recorded for Capitol. "They Can't Take That Away from Me" and "I Get a Kick Out of You" had been recorded eight years earlier for Songs for Young Lovers, "You Brought a New Kind of Love to Me" had been recorded six years prior for Songs for Swingin' Lovers, and "At Long Last Love" had been recorded five years earlier for A Swingin' Affair!.

Track listing
"Goody Goody" (Johnny Mercer, Matty Malneck)  – 1:47
"They Can't Take That Away from Me" (George Gershwin, Ira Gershwin)  – 2:41
"At Long Last Love" (Cole Porter)  – 2:14
"I'm Beginning to See the Light" (Johnny Hodges, Harry James, Duke Ellington, Don George)  – 2:34
"Don'cha Go 'Way Mad" (Jimmy Mundy, Al Stillman, Illinois Jacquet)  – 3:12
"I Get a Kick Out of You" (Porter)  – 3:14
"Tangerine" (Victor Schertzinger, Johnny Mercer)  – 2:03
"Love Is Just around the Corner" (Lewis E. Gensler, Leo Robin)  – 2:27
"Ain't She Sweet" (Milton Ager, Jack Yellen)  – 2:07
"Serenade In Blue" (Harry Warren, Mack Gordon)  – 2:58
"I Love You" (Porter)  – 2:16
"Pick Yourself Up" (Jerome Kern, Dorothy Fields)  – 2:33
 Cd reissue bonus tracks not included on the 1962 release:
"Everybody's Twistin'" (Rube Bloom, Ted Koehler)  – 2:31
"Nothing But the Best" (Johnny Rotella)  – 3:00
"You Brought a New Kind of Love to Me" (Sammy Fain, Irving Kahal, Pierre Norman Connor)  – 2:38

The last three songs are bonus tracks on the 1992 compact disc release, not available on the 1998 Entertainer of the Century remastered series.

Personnel
 Frank Sinatra - vocals
 Neal Hefti - arranger, conductor

References

1962 albums
Frank Sinatra albums
Albums arranged by Neal Hefti
Albums conducted by Neal Hefti
Reprise Records albums